HUBOZ is an abbreviation for the Chief Administration in Fight with the Organized Crime of the Ministry of Internal Affairs of Ukraine was a specialized law enforcement agency. The agency director was the first deputy of the minister of Internal Affairs of Ukraine and acted as a minister in his or her absence. 

HUBOZ director also governed the Department of Internal Security of HUBOZ.

In 2015 HUBOZ was liquidated with some other militsiya detachments of special purpose.

Scope and purpose
discovering and ceasing activities of the stable socially dangerous organized groups and crime organizations that influence the social-economical and crime generating situation in regions and country
fight with corruption and bribery in the spheres that have a strategic meaning for the state economy among senior government officials, officials of judicial, law enforcement and regulatory authorities
discovering and liquidation of crime schemes directed on legalization of income that were received as result of crime activities of organized groups and crime organizations
providing reimbursement of losses to the state as well as individuals and legal entities caused by the activities of organized groups and crime organizations or corrupt acts

History

List of commanders
List of commanders
 Lieutenant General Valeriy Koryak 2010 - present
 Volodymyr Bedrykivsky 2008 - 2010
 Ihor Bilozub 2006 - 2008
 Serhiy Kornich 2005 - 2006
 Valeriy Heletey 02-03/2005
 Mykhailo Manin 2003 - 2005
 Yuriy Cherkasov 11/2002 - 2003
 Mykola Dzhyha 08/2002 - 11/2002
 Mykhailo Korniyenko 10/2000 - 08/2002
 Mykola Dzhyha 04/1998 - 10/2000
 Yuriy Vandin 07/1995 - 04/1998
 Oleksandr Ishchenko 12/1992 - 07/1995
 Hryhoriy Sheludko 05/1992 - 12/1992

See also
Berkut (Ukraine)

Notes

References

External links
Official Website (Ukrainian language)
HUBOZ page on the website of Ministry of Internal Affairs 
Official website of the Ukrainian bureau of Interpol

Law enforcement agencies of Ukraine
Defunct law enforcement agencies of Ukraine
2015 disestablishments in Ukraine